Aimee Elizabeth Semple McPherson (née Kennedy; October 9, 1890 – September 27, 1944), also known as Sister Aimee or Sister, was a Canadian Pentecostal evangelist and media celebrity in the 1920s and 1930s, famous for founding the Foursquare Church. McPherson pioneered the use of broadcast mass media for wider dissemination of both religious services and appeals for donations, using radio to draw in both additional audience and revenue with the growing appeal of popular entertainment and incorporating stage techniques into her weekly sermons at Angelus Temple, an early megachurch.

In her time, she was the most publicized Protestant evangelist, surpassing Billy Sunday and other predecessors. She conducted public faith healing demonstrations involving tens of thousands of participants. McPherson's view of the United States as a nation founded and sustained by divine inspiration influenced later pastors.

National news coverage focused on events surrounding her family and church members, including accusations that she fabricated her reported kidnapping. McPherson's preaching style, extensive charity work and ecumenical contributions were a major influence on 20th century Charismatic Christianity.

Biography

Early life
McPherson was born Aimee Elizabeth Kennedy in Salford, Ontario, Canada, to James Morgan and Mildred Ona (Pearce) Kennedy (1871–1947). She had early exposure to religion through her mother, Mildred, who worked with the poor in Salvation Army soup kitchens. As a child she would play "Salvation Army" with classmates and preach sermons to dolls.

As a teenager, McPherson strayed from her mother's teachings by reading novels and attending movies and dances, activities disapproved of by the Salvation Army and her father's Methodist religion. In high school, she was taught the Theory of Evolution. She began to ask questions about faith and science, but was unsatisfied with the answers. She wrote to a Canadian newspaper, questioning the taxpayer-funded teaching of evolution. This was her first exposure to fame, as people nationwide responded to her letter, and the beginning of a lifelong anti-evolution crusade.

Conversion, marriage, and family 

While attending a revival meeting in 1907, McPherson met Robert James Semple, a Pentecostal missionary from Ireland. She dedicated her life to Jesus and converted to Pentecostalism. At the meeting, she became enraptured by Semple and his message. After a short courtship, they were married in an August 1908 Salvation Army ceremony. Semple supported them as a foundry worker and preached at the local Pentecostal mission. They studied the Bible together, then moved to Chicago and joined William Durham's Full Gospel Assembly. Durham instructed her in the practice of interpretation of tongues.

After embarking on an evangelistic tour to China, both contracted malaria. Semple also contracted dysentery, of which he died in Hong Kong. McPherson recovered and gave birth to their daughter, Roberta Star Semple. On board a ship returning to the United States, she held religious services and classes.

After her recuperation in the United States, McPherson joined her mother Mildred working with the Salvation Army. While in New York City, she met accountant Harold Stewart McPherson. They were married in 1912, moved to Providence, Rhode Island, and had a son, Rolf Potter Kennedy McPherson, in 1913.

During this time, McPherson felt as though she denied her "calling" to go preach. Struggling with emotional distress and obsessive–compulsive disorder, she would weep and pray. In 1914, she fell seriously ill with appendicitis. McPherson later stated that after a failed operation, she heard a voice asking her to go preach. After accepting the voice's challenge, she said, she was able to turn over in bed without pain. In 1915, her husband returned home and discovered that McPherson had left him and taken the children. A few weeks later, he received a note inviting him to join her in evangelistic work.

Harold McPherson followed her to bring her home, but changed his mind after seeing her preaching, and joined her in evangelism, setting up tents for revival meetings and preaching. The couple sold their house and lived out of their "Gospel Car". Harold McPherson, despite his initial enthusiasm, wanted a more stable and predictable life, and returned to Rhode Island. In 1918 he filed for separation, then petitioned for divorce, citing abandonment; the divorce was granted in 1921.

McPherson remarried in 1932 to actor and musician David Hutton. After she fell and fractured her skull, she visited Europe to recover. While there, she was angered to learn Hutton was billing himself as "Aimee's man" in his cabaret singing act and was frequently photographed with scantily clad women. Hutton's personal scandals were damaging the reputation of the Foursquare Gospel Church and its leader. McPherson and Hutton separated in 1933 and divorced in 1934. McPherson later publicly repented of the marriage for both theological and personal reasons and later rejected gospel singer Homer Rodeheaver when he proposed marriage in 1935.

Ministry
As part of William Durham's Full Gospel Assembly in Chicago, McPherson became known for interpreting glossolalia, translating the words of people speaking in tongues. Unable to find fulfillment as a housewife, in 1913, McPherson began evangelizing, holding tent revivals across the Sawdust Trail. McPherson quickly amassed a large following, often having to relocate to larger buildings to accommodate growing crowds. She emulated the enthusiasm of Pentecostal meetings but sought to avoid excesses, in which participants would shout, tremble on the floor, and speak in tongues. McPherson set up a separate tent area for such displays of religious fervor, which could be off-putting to larger audiences.

In 1916, McPherson embarked on a tour of the Southern United States, and again in 1918 with Mildred Kennedy. Standing on the back seat of their convertible, McPherson preached sermons over a megaphone.

In 1917, she started a magazine, Bridal Call, for which she wrote articles about women's roles in religion; she portrayed the link between Christians and Jesus as a marriage bond. Along with taking women's roles seriously, the magazine contributed to transforming Pentecostalism into an ongoing American religious presence.

In Baltimore in 1919 she was first "discovered" by newspapers after conducting evangelistic services at the Lyric Opera House, where she performed faith-healing demonstrations. During these events the crowds in their religious ecstasy were barely kept under control. Baltimore became a pivotal point for her early career.

She was ordained evangelist by the Assemblies of God USA in 1919.  However, she ended her association with the Assemblies of God USA in 1922.

Career in Los Angeles 
In 1918, McPherson moved to Los Angeles. Mildred Kennedy rented the 3,500-seat Philharmonic Auditorium, and people waited for hours to get into the crowded venue. Afterwards, attendees of her meetings built a home for her family. At this time, Los Angeles was a popular vacation destination. Rather than touring the United States, McPherson chose to stay in Los Angeles, drawing audiences from both visitors and the city's burgeoning population. Her ministry to tourists allowed her message to spread nationwide.

For several years, she traveled and raised money for the construction of a large, domed church in the Echo Park area of Los Angeles, named Angelus Temple, in reference to the Angelus bell and to angels. Not wanting to incur debt, McPherson found a construction firm willing to work with her as funds were raised "by faith", beginning with $5,000 for the foundation. McPherson mobilized diverse groups to fund and build the church, by means such as selling chairs for Temple seating. In his book 'Growing up in Hollywood' Robert Parrish describes in detail attending one of her services.

Raising more money than expected, McPherson altered the plans and built a "megachurch". The endeavor cost contributors around $250,000. Costs were kept down by donations of building materials and labor. The dedication took place in 1923.

Enrollment grew to over 10,000, and Angelus Temple was advertised as the largest single Christian congregation in the world. According to church records, the Temple received 40 million visitors within the first seven years.

Despite some affinities with Pentecostals, her beliefs are interdenominational.

Charitable work

McPherson developed a church organization to provide for physical as well as spiritual needs. McPherson mobilized people to get involved in charity and social work, saying that "true Christianity is not only to be good but to do good." The Temple collected donations for humanitarian relief including for a Japanese disaster and a German relief fund. Men released from prison were found jobs by a "brotherhood". A "sisterhood" sewed baby clothing for impoverished mothers.

In June 1925, after an earthquake in Santa Barbara McPherson interrupted a radio broadcast to request food, blankets, clothing, and emergency supplies. In 1928, after a dam failed and the ensuing flood left up to 600 dead, McPherson's church led the relief effort. In 1933, an earthquake struck and devastated Long Beach. McPherson quickly arranged for volunteers offering blankets, coffee, and doughnuts. McPherson persuaded fire and police departments to assist in distribution. Doctors, physicians, and dentists staffed her free clinic that trained nurses to treat children and the elderly. To prevent the power from being turned off to homes of overdue accounts during the winter, a cash reserve was set up with the utility company.

Drawing from her childhood experience with the Salvation Army, in 1927 McPherson opened a commissary at Angelus Temple offering food, clothing, and blankets. She became active in creating soup kitchens, free clinics, and other charitable activities during the Great Depression, and fed an estimated 1.5 million. Volunteer workers filled commissary baskets with food and other items, as well as Foursquare Gospel literature. When the government shut down the free school-lunch program, McPherson took it over. Her giving "alleviated suffering on an epic scale". 

In 1932, the commissary was raided by police, allegedly to locate a still used to make brandy out of donated apricots. As a consequence, the commissary was briefly shut down, and the staff was let go. However, students from her Foursquare Gospel Church's L.I.F.E. Bible College filled in.

As McPherson refused to distinguish between the "deserving" and the "undeserving," her temple commissary became known as an effective and inclusive aid institution, assisting more families than other public or private institutions. Because her programs aided nonresidents such as migrants from other states and Mexico, she ran afoul of California state regulations. Though temple guidelines were later officially adjusted to accommodate those policies, helping families in need was a priority, regardless of their place of residence.

Ministry

Style of ministry 
In August 1925, McPherson chartered a plane to Los Angeles to give her Sunday sermon. Aware of the opportunity for publicity, she arranged for followers and press at the airport. The plane failed after takeoff and the landing gear collapsed, sending the nose of the plane into the ground. McPherson used the experience as the narrative of an illustrated sermon called "The Heavenly Airplane", featuring the devil as pilot, sin as the engine, and temptation as propeller. 

On another occasion, she described being pulled over by a police officer, calling the sermon "Arrested for Speeding". Dressed in a traffic cop's uniform, she sat in a police motorcycle and blared the siren. One author in attendance wrote that she drove the motorcycle across the access ramp to the pulpit, slammed the brakes, and raised a hand to shout "Stop! You're speeding to Hell!"

McPherson employed a small group of artists, electricians, decorators, and carpenters, who built sets for each service. Religious music was played by an orchestra. McPherson also worked on elaborate sacred operas. One production,  The Iron Furnace, based on the Exodus story, saw Hollywood actors assist with obtaining costumes.

Though McPherson condemned theater and film as the devil's workshop, its techniques were co-opted. She became the first woman evangelist to adopt cinematic methods to avoid dreary church services. Serious messages were delivered in a humorous tone. Animals were frequently incorporated. McPherson gave up to 22 sermons a week, including lavish Sunday night services so large that extra trolleys and police were needed to help route the traffic through Echo Park. To finance the Temple and its projects, collections were taken at every meeting.

McPherson preached a conservative gospel, but used progressive methods, taking advantage of radio, movies, and stage acts. She attracted some women associated with modernism, but others were put off by the contrast between her message and her presentation.

The battle between fundamentalists and modernists escalated after World War I. Fundamentalists generally believed their faith should influence every aspect of their lives. Despite her modern style, McPherson aligned with the fundamentalists in seeking to eradicate modernism and secularism in homes, churches, schools, and communities.

The appeal of McPherson's revival events from 1919 to 1922 surpassed any touring event of theater or politics in American history. She broke attendance records recently set by Billy Sunday and frequently used his temporary tabernacle structures to hold her meetings. One such revival was held in a boxing ring, and throughout the boxing event, she carried a sign reading "knock out the Devil". In San Diego the city called in the National Guard to control a revival crowd of over 30,000 people.

Faith healing ministry 

McPherson's ability to draw crowds was also greatly assisted by her faith healing presentations. According to Nancy Barr Mavity, an early McPherson biographer, the evangelist claimed that when she laid hands on sick or injured persons, they got well because of the power of God in her. During a 1916 revival in New York, a woman in advanced stages of rheumatoid arthritis was brought to the altar by friends. McPherson laid hands on her and prayed, and the woman apparently walked out of the church without crutches. McPherson's reputation as a faith healer grew as people came to her by the tens of thousands. McPherson's faith-healing practices were extensively covered in the news and were a large part of her early-career success. Over time, though, she largely withdrew from faith-healing, but still scheduled weekly and monthly healing sessions which remained popular until her death.

The Foursquare Church

McPherson published the weekly Foursquare Crusader. She began broadcasting on radio in the early 1920s. In April 1922, she became the first woman to preach a sermon wirelessly. With the opening of Foursquare Gospel-owned KFSG in 1924, she became the second woman granted a broadcast license by the Department of Commerce, which supervised broadcasting at the time.

In October 1922, she explained her vision of "Foursquare Gospel" (or "Full Gospel") in a sermon in Oakland, California. This represents the 4 aspects of the ministry of Jesus Christ; Savior, Baptizer with the Holy Ghost, Healer and King.

McPherson racially integrated her tent meetings and church services. On one occasion, as a response to integration, Ku Klux Klan members were in attendance, but after the service, their hoods and robes were found on the ground nearby. She is also credited with helping Hispanic ministries in Los Angeles.

McPherson caused concern among some Los Angeles churches. Though she shared many of their fundamentalist beliefs, her lavish sermons and faith-healing events, along with her status as a female divorcee, were unprecedented, and her style of dress was drawing emulators. Her illustrated sermons attracted criticism from some clergy members for allegedly turning the Gospel message into mundane entertainment. Faith healing was considered to be unique to Apostolic times. Rival radio evangelist Robert P. Shuler published a pamphlet titled McPhersonism, in which he called her ministry "out of harmony with God's word." Debates such as the Bogard-McPherson debate in 1934 drew further attention to the controversy.

The newly forming Assemblies of God denomination worked with her for a time, but it encouraged her to separate her church from established Protestant faiths. McPherson resisted trends to isolate her church as a denomination and continued her evangelical coalition-building. She was helped by the establishment of L.I.F.E. Bible College adjacent to the Temple, which was intended to train ministers so they would be able to share her new "Foursquare Gospel" both nationally and internationally. Methodist minister Frank Thompson ran the college, teaching students the doctrines of John Wesley, while McPherson and others infused them with Pentecostal ideals. McPherson's efforts eventually led Pentecostals, who were previously on the periphery of Christianity, into mainstream American evangelicalism.

Life in the media spotlight

Heightened Fame
By early 1926, McPherson had become one of the most charismatic and influential women and ministers of her time. Her fame equaled, to name a few, Charles Lindbergh, Johnny Weissmuller, Jack Dempsey, Babe Ruth, Ty Cobb, Knute Rockne, Bobby Jones, Louise Brooks, and Rudolph Valentino. She was a major American phenomenon, who along with some other high profile preachers of the time, unlike Hollywood celebrities, could be admired by their adoring public, "without apparently compromising their souls."

Scopes trial

McPherson crusaded against Darwinian evolution and became a supporter of William Jennings Bryan during the 1925 Scopes trial, about local laws prohibiting the teaching of human evolution. Bryan and McPherson worked together in the Temple, and they believed that Darwinism undermined morality, "poisoning the minds of the children of the nation." McPherson organized an all-night prayer service, preceded by a Bible parade through Los Angeles."

Politics
McPherson's political alignment was undisclosed. She endorsed Herbert Hoover, but threw her support behind Franklin D. Roosevelt and his social programs after his election. She patronized organized labor, preaching that a gangster's money was "no more unclean than the dollars of the man who amasses his millions from underpaid factory workers". She was more cautious when labor strikes resulted in violent uprisings, and worried about Communism's influence in labor unions. McPherson opposed both Communism and fascism as totalitarian rule; Communism ruling without God and fascism wrongly stating to represent the power of God.

McPherson did not align herself consistently with any broad conservative or liberal political agenda. Instead, she wanted Christianity to occupy a central place in national life. The Foursquare Gospel Church currently qualifies the evangelist's views "in light of the political and religious climate of the 1920s, 30s, and 40s," drawing a contrast between her approach and "today's extreme fundamentalist, right-wing Christianity." She was also among the first prominent Christian ministers to defend the establishment of a Jewish homeland in Palestine.

Reported kidnapping

The reported kidnapping of Aimee Semple McPherson caused a media frenzy and changed her life and career. After disappearing in May 1926, she reappeared in Mexico five weeks later, stating she had been held for ransom in a desert shack. Subsequent grand-jury inquiries precipitated continued public interest.

Disappearance and return
On May 18, 1926, McPherson disappeared from Ocean Park Beach in Santa Monica, CA. Presuming she had drowned, searchers combed the area. McPherson sightings were reported around the county, often many miles apart. The Temple received calls and letters claiming knowledge of McPherson, including ransom demands. After weeks of unpromising leads, Mildred Kennedy believed her daughter to be dead.

After the  Temple's memorial service, three days later on June 23, Kennedy received a phone call from Douglas, Arizona. McPherson was alive in a Douglas hospital, and relating her story to officials.

McPherson said that at the beach she had been approached by a couple who wanted her to pray over their sick child. After walking with them to their car, she was shoved inside. A cloth laced with chloroform was held against her face, causing her to pass out. Eventually, she was moved to a shack in the Mexican desert. When her captors were away, McPherson escaped out a window and traveled through the desert for 11–17 hours and an estimated 17–20 miles (27–32 km), reaching Agua Prieta, Sonora, a Mexican border town, at around 1:00 a.m. Collapsing near a house, the evangelist was taken by locals to adjacent Douglas.

Her return to Los Angeles was greeted by 30,000–50,000 people, a greater turnout than President Woodrow Wilson's 1919 visit to Los Angeles.

Grand jury inquiries
Los Angeles prosecutors had varying theories why she disappeared, among them a publicity stunt, and finally contended that McPherson ran off with a former employee, Kenneth Ormiston, staying with him in a California resort town cottage he had rented. After leaving the cottage at the end of May, the pair traveled for the next three weeks and remained hidden. Around June 22, Ormiston drove McPherson to Mexico, dropping her off 3 miles outside of nearby Agua Prieta, where she walked the remaining distance.  In contrast, McPherson consistently maintained her kidnapping story, and defense witnesses corroborated her assertions.

Much of the evidence asserted against McPherson came from reporters, who passed it on to police. The bulk of the investigation against McPherson was funded by Los Angeles-area newspapers at an estimated amount of $500,000. The secrecy of California's grand jury proceedings was ignored by both sides as the Los Angeles prosecution passed new developments to the press, while the evangelist used her radio station to broadcast her side of the story.

Case dismissal and aftermath
On November 3, the case was to be moved to jury trial set for January 1927, charging McPherson, her mother, and other defendants with criminal conspiracy, perjury and obstruction of justice. If convicted, McPherson faced a maximum prison time of 42 years. However, the prosecution's case developed credibility issues. Witnesses changed testimonies and evidence often appeared to have suspicious origins or was mishandled and lost in custody.  On January 2, Ormiston identified another woman as the companion who stayed with him at the cottage. All charges against McPherson and associated parties were dropped for the lack of evidence on January 10. However, months of unfavorable news reports produced enduring public belief in McPherson's wrongdoing.

Claims of extramarital affairs

Allegations of love affairs directed against McPherson started during the 1926 kidnapping trial. Suspected lovers generally denied involvement. Alarmed by her style of dress and involvement with Hollywood, a Temple official hired detectives in 1929 to shadow McPherson. The detectives found no evidence of affairs. After McPherson's death, unsubstantiated allegations of affairs continued to emerge. Canadian journalist Gordon Sinclair claimed a 1934 affair in his autobiography. Another claim by comedian Milton Berle alleged a brief affair with the evangelist. Berle asserted that he met McPherson in Los Angeles where both were doing a charity show. Another book by Berle published during McPherson's life did not claim an affair. Biographer Matthew Sutton asserted that Berle's story of a crucifix in McPherson's bedroom was inconsistent with the coolness of Pentecostal-Catholic relations during that era. Other contradictions in Milton Berle's story were noted as well. During that period,  from publications, church and travel records, the evangelist's appearances and whereabouts could be traced almost every day, and there was no record of the charity show Berle alleged. McPherson had her own charities. Moreover, she was incapacitated with illness a full five months of that year,  By 1931, McPherson kept herself chaperoned to guard against allegations."

Later life and career

Cinema
After the kidnapping, McPherson remained nationally famous and continued her ministry, but fell out of press favor. The media, which once dubbed her a "miracle worker", focused on disturbances in her household, including difficulties with her mother.

Despite this, up to 10% of the population in Los Angeles held Temple membership, and movie studios competed to offer her contracts. Believing that film had the potential to transform Christianity, McPherson explored Hollywood culture and appeared in newsreels alongside Mary Pickford, Frances Perkins, and Franklin D. Roosevelt. She lost weight, cut and dyed her hair, began to wear makeup and jewelry, and became known for stylish dress. This solicitation of fame was off-putting to some church members who preferred her former uniform of a navy cape over a white servant's dress.

In 1927, McPherson set out on a tour, taking advantage of the publicity from her kidnapping story to preach. She even visited nightclubs, including Texas Guinan's speakeasy, where she addressed the crowd. Her visits to bars added to McPherson's notoriety: newspapers reported heavily on them; and rumors erroneously implied she was drinking, smoking and dancing.

Problems with Mildred Kennedy

Mildred Kennedy did not agree with McPherson's strategy of tearing down barriers between the secular and religious. In 1927, Kennedy left the Temple, along with other church members including 300 members of the choir. Attempting to curtail her daughter's influence, Kennedy initiated a staff-member confidence vote against McPherson, but lost. The two had argued over management and McPherson's changing dress and appearance. Kennedy's administrative skills had been crucial to growing McPherson's ministry and maintaining Temple activities. A series of management staff replaced Kennedy, and the Temple became involved in various unsuccessful projects such as hotel building, cemetery plots, and land sales, plummeting into debt. In response to the difficulties, Kennedy returned in 1929, but because of continued disagreements with McPherson, resigned again in July 1930. The following month, McPherson had a physical and nervous breakdown. For 10 months, she was absent from the pulpit, diagnosed with acute acidosis.

Resurrecting her career
When she returned, she introduced her "Attar of Roses" sermon, based on the Song of Solomon. In October 1931 McPherson held a revival in Boston, a city with large Unitarian, Episcopalian, and Catholic populations, traditionally hostile to Pentecostal messages. On opening night, McPherson spoke to fewer than 5,000 in the 22,000-seat sports arena. The following day, her campaign's tone shifted and attendance climbed sharply. The final day of afternoon and evening services saw 40,000 people attending, exceeding the stadium venue's capacity and breaking attendance records.

McPherson's revival in New York City was less fruitful due to her sensationalistic reputation. McPherson went on to Washington D.C. and Philadelphia, and visited 21 states. A full crew of musicians, scene designers, and costumers accompanied McPherson. In her last national revival tour, 1933–1934, two million persons heard 336 sermons.

The Boston Evening Traveller newspaper reported:

McPherson was not a radical literalist. She believed that the creation story in the book of Genesis allowed great latitude of interpretation, and did not insist on Young Earth creationism. In another meeting with students, McPherson heard an assertion that Christianity had outlived its usefulness. The encounter persuaded her to travel and gain new perspectives. In 1935, McPherson embarked on a six-month world tour, partly to study the women's movement in connection with India's independence struggle and speak with Mahatma Gandhi, who gave her a sari made on his spinning wheel. Impressed with Gandhi, McPherson thought that he might secretly lean toward Christianity. Other highlights included visiting Shwedagon Pagoda in Myanmar, hearing Benito Mussolini speak in Italy, and sitting on a wrecked military vehicle on a still-uncleared battlefield in Verdun, France.

In mid-1936, a delegation associated with the 1906 Azusa Street Mission Revivals, including African-American Evangelist Emma Cotton, asked to use the Angelus Temple for their 30th anniversary celebration. Cotton and McPherson organized a series of meetings, also marking McPherson's re-identification with Pentecostalism. McPherson's experiments with celebrity had been less successful than she hoped, and alliances with other church groups were failing or defunct. Therefore, she looked to her spiritual origins and considered reintroducing Pentecostal elements into her public meetings. Temple officials were concerned that the Azusa people might bring "wildfire and Holy Rollerism." 

Out of the Azusa Street Revival, black leaders and other minorities appeared on her pulpit, including Charles Harrison Mason, an African American and founder of the Churches of God in Christ, a significant Pentecostal leader. McPherson recommitted herself to the dissemination of "classic Pentecostalism", expressing concern that the Foursquare approach was in danger of becoming too "churchy". For the first time since the Temple opened, McPherson began to publicly speak in tongues.

Problems with the Temple
McPherson reassigned staff in an effort to address the Temple's financial difficulties. This worsened tensions among staff members. Rumors circulated that charismatic evangelist Rheba Crawford Splivalo, who had been working with McPherson for years, planned to take the Temple from her. McPherson asked Splivalo to "leave town". In the course of the staff controversy, McPherson's lawyer issued a strongly worded press release that upset Roberta Star Semple, McPherson's daughter, and led her to initiate a $150,000 slander lawsuit against him. Splivalo also sued McPherson for $1,080,000 because of alleged statements calling her a Jezebel and a Judas.

The two lawsuits filed by Semple and Splivalo were unrelated, but McPherson saw both as part of the Temple takeover plot. McPherson's mother sided with Roberta Semple, making unflattering statements about McPherson to the press. McPherson's defense in a public trial was dramatic and theatrical; she testified tearfully about how her daughter conspired against her. Her daughter's lawyer, meanwhile, mocked McPherson by imitating her mannerisms. The trial estranged McPherson from her daughter. The judge ruled for Semple, giving a $2,000 judgment in her favor. Semple then moved to New York. Splivalo and the Temple settled their suit out of court for the "cause of religion and the good of the community."

With Kennedy, Semple, and Splivalo gone, the Temple lost much of its leadership. However, McPherson found a new administrator in Giles Knight, who brought the Temple out of debt, disposed of 40 or so lawsuits, and eliminated spurious projects. He sequestered McPherson, allowed her to receive only a few personal visitors, and regulated her activities outside the Temple. This period was one of unprecedented creativity for McPherson. No longer distracted by  reporters and lawsuits, she developed her illustrative sermon style. The irreligious Charlie Chaplin secretly attended her services, and she later consulted with Chaplin on ways to improve her presentations. McPherson's public image improved. Her adversary, Robert P. Shuler, who previously attacked her, proclaimed that "Aimee's missionary work was the envy of Methodists". He also expressed his support of her Foursquare Church's 1943 application for admittance into National Association of Evangelicals for United Action.

Her efforts toward interracial revival continued. She welcomed black people into the congregation and pulpit. While race riots burned Detroit in 1943, McPherson publicly converted the black former heavyweight champion Jack Johnson on the Temple stage and embraced him.

War years
In the 1930s McPherson and the Foursquare Gospel Church explored Pacifism, a component of Pentecostalism. McPherson also considered Gandhi's views on pacifism, and Clinton Howard, chairman of the World Peace Commission, was invited to speak at the Temple. In 1932, she promoted disarmament. Foursquare leaders, alarmed at rapid changes in military technology, drew up an amendment inclusive of varied opinions on military service. Two views were held acceptable: the idea that one could bear arms in a righteous cause; and the view that killing of others, even in connection to military service, would endanger their souls. McPherson monitored international events leading up to the Second World War, believing that the apocalypse and the Second Coming of Christ were at hand.

All-night prayer meetings were held at the Temple starting in 1940 as Germany occupied Europe. She asked other Foursquare churches around the country to follow suit. She sent President Franklin Roosevelt's secretary, Stephen Early, an outline of her plans, and various officials expressed appreciation, including the governor of California.

At the outbreak of World War II, McPherson rejected the Christian pacifism popular in the Pentecostal movement, saying that, "It is the Bible against Mein Kampf. It is the Cross against the Swastika. It is God against the antichrist of Japan...This is no time for pacifism." The Temple itself became a symbol of homefront sacrifice for the war effort. Its white dome was painted black and its stained-glass windows covered in anticipation of air raids. To advertise the need to conserve gasoline and rubber, McPherson drove a horse and buggy to the Temple.

Rubber and other drives were organized, and unlimited airtime on her radio station, was given to the Office of War Information. She asked listeners to donate two hours a day for such tasks as rolling bandages. Money was raised to provide military bases with comfortable furnishings and radios. Newsweek published an article about McPherson, "The World's Greatest Living Minister" in 1943, noting that she had collected 2,800 pints of blood for the Red Cross; servicemen in her audience are especially honored, and the climax of her church services is when she reads the National Anthem. McPherson gave visiting servicemen autographed Bibles.  She wrote:

She insulted Adolf Hitler and Hideki Tōjō, and became involved in war bond rallies. McPherson sold $150,000 worth of bonds in one hour in 1942, breaking previous records, then repeated the performance in 1944. The U.S. Treasury awarded her a special citation and the army made McPherson an honorary colonel. Her wartime activities included sermons linking the church and patriotism. She felt that if the Allies did not prevail, churches, homes, and everything dear to Christians would be destroyed.

McPherson's embrace of the total war strategy of the United States left her open to some criticism. The line between the church as an independent moral authority monitoring government became blurred. Japanese Americans' internment in relocation camps was overlooked, and she refused to allow her denomination to support Christians who remained pacifist. Church members and leaders were expected to be willing to take up arms. The pacifist clause, by her proposal, was eliminated by the Foursquare Gospel Church.

Death

On September 26, 1944, McPherson went to Oakland, California, for a series of revivals, planning to preach her popular "Story of My Life" sermon. When McPherson's son went to her hotel room at 10:00 the next morning, he found her unconscious with pills and a half-empty bottle of capsules nearby. She was dead by 11:15. It was later discovered that she had called her doctor that morning complaining of feeling ill from the medicine, but he was in surgery. She then phoned another doctor who referred her to yet another physician. However, McPherson lost consciousness before the third could be contacted.

The autopsy revealed a heart attack, probably caused by an overdose of sleeping pills. She had been taking sleeping pills following numerous health problems. Among the pills found in the hotel room was the barbiturate secobarbital, a strong sedative which had not been prescribed for her. It was unknown how she obtained them. Given the circumstances, there was speculation about suicide, but most sources generally agree the overdose was accidental.

45,000 people waited in long lines, some until 2 a.m., to file past the evangelist, whose body lay in state for three days at the Temple. It later took 11 trucks to transport the $50,000 worth of flowers to the cemetery. Though they had left McPherson's employ on bad terms, her former assistant pastor Rheba Crawford Splivalo, daughter Roberta, and her mother Mildred Kennedy were also in attendance.

An observer, Marcus Bach, wrote:

Millions of dollars passed through McPherson's hands. However, when her personal estate was calculated, it amounted to $10,000. To her daughter, Roberta, went $2,000 the remainder to her son Rolf. By contrast, her mother Mildred Kennedy had a 1927 severance settlement of as much as $200,000 in cash and property; the Foursquare Church itself was worth $2.8 million.

McPherson is buried in Forest Lawn Memorial Park Cemetery in Glendale, California. Following her death, the Foursquare Gospel church denomination was led for 44 years by her son Rolf McPherson.

Legacy and influence
After her death, the largely negative aspect of her media image persisted and became the dominant factor in defining McPherson for many in the public. Robert P. Shuler, whose caustic view of McPherson softened over the years, wrote that McPherson's flaws were many, yet she ultimately made a positive lasting impact on Christianity. He recognized her appeal as a combination of identifying with average citizens and an ability to preach in simple terms. Her legacy continued through the thousands of ministers she trained and churches planted worldwide. McPherson helped to reshape evangelical Christianity, making it relevant to American culture and personally involving for listeners.

McPherson influenced later ministers including child preacher Uldine Utley and Dr. Edwin Louis Cole, who went on to found the Christian Men's Network. Biographer Matthew Sutton wrote that McPherson helped to forestall the replacement of traditional Protestantism by new scientific and philosophical ideas. Liberal Christianity, which was growing in the late 19th century, regarded Biblical miracles as superstition or metaphor. McPherson's faith-healing ministry promoted the idea that miraculous healings could occur in modern times.

McPherson's ecumenical approach assisted Pentecostals in explaining their faith in the context of historic church doctrine. Mainline churches became exposed to differing beliefs about gifts of the Holy Spirit. They borrowed Pentecostal revival techniques including emotive expression, praise worship, and testimonials, forerunning the Charismatic Movement.

McPherson challenged expectations for women. Her gender and divorces were of particular concern to many fundamentalist churches with which she wanted to work. However, atheist Charles Lee Smith remarked that she had an extraordinary mind, "particularly for a woman".

Her continual work at church alliance-building finally bore posthumous fruit. Foursquare Gospel Church leaders joined the National Association of Evangelicals in 1952 and helped organize the Pentecostal World Fellowship. Pentecostalism, which once advocated separatism and was on the fringes of Protestantism, became part of mainstream Christianity.

The Foursquare church claims a membership of over 7.9 million worldwide in 2019.

Portrayals
McPherson was the subject of or inspiration for numerous books, films, plays, and television shows. A musical titled AIMEE!, by Patrick Young and Bob Ashley, was produced in 1981 in Canada. Kathie Lee Gifford, David Friedman, and David Pomeranz, wrote the biographical musical Scandalous: The Life and Trials of Aimee Semple McPherson, which was produced on Broadway in 2012 starring Carolee Carmello as McPherson. (An earlier version of this musical was titled Saving Aimee.) An Evangelist Drowns (2007), a one-woman play based on McPherson's life, includes fictionalized accounts of relationships with Charlie Chaplin and David Hutton. Spit Shine Glisten (2013), loosely based on the life of McPherson, was performed at the California Institute of the Arts in Valencia, Santa Clarita. The musical Vanishing Point, written by Rob Hartmann, Liv Cummins, and Scott Keys, intertwines the lives of evangelist McPherson, aviator Amelia Earhart, and mystery writer Agatha Christie. It was included in the 2010–2011 season at the Carnegie Mellon School of Drama in Pittsburgh, Pennsylvania.

A television film about the events which surrounded McPherson's 1926 disappearance, The Disappearance of Aimee (1976), starred Faye Dunaway as McPherson and Bette Davis as her mother. The movie Sister Aimee (2019), starring Amy Hargreaves, is a fictional account of McPherson's 1926 disappearance.

Characters who were modeled on McPherson included Sharon Falconer in Sinclair Lewis's novel Elmer Gantry (played by Jean Simmons in the film adaptation), faith-healing evangelist Big Sister in Nathanael West's The Day of the Locust (played by Geraldine Page in the film adaptation) and corrupt small-town minister Eli Watkins in Upton Sinclair's novel Oil!. The characters of Mrs. Melrose Ape in Evelyn Waugh's novel Vile Bodies and Reno Sweeney in Cole Porter's musical comedy Anything Goes are inspired by McPherson's habit of traveling with a troupe of young women who would portray "angels" in her ministry events. Frank Capra's film The Miracle Woman (1931), starring Barbara Stanwyck, was based on John Meehan's play Bless You, Sister, which was reportedly inspired by McPherson's life.

In 2020, two American television series featured characters based on McPherson: Sister Molly Finnister (Kerry Bishé) in Penny Dreadful: City of Angels and Sister Alice McKeegan (Tatiana Maslany) in Perry Mason.

Publications
 Declaration of Faith, The International Church of the Foursquare Gospel (1920)
 
 
 
Perfection, Can a Christian Be Perfect?, Echo Park Evangelistic Association (1930)

See also
 Elmer Gantry (film)
 List of kidnappings
 List of solved missing person cases: pre-2000
 Scandalous: The Life and Trials of Aimee Semple McPherson, a 2012 Broadway musical

References

 Richard R. Lingeman, Sinclair Lewis: Rebel from Main Street, Minnesota Historical Society Press, June 2005, .

Further reading

External links
 Aimee Semple McPherson Papers, Billy Graham Center Archives, Wheaton College.
 
 "Aimee McPherson" Old Time Radio
 Foursquare Gospel church
 Aimee Semple McPherson biography
 Biography from Liberty Harbor Foursquare Gospel Church
 genius.com/Pete-seeger-aimee-semple-mcpherson-lyrics, dating from when it was a current news story. Pete Seeger recorded this on the 1961 album Story Songs.
 Woman Thou Art God: Female Empowerment, Spirituality & a biography on Aimee.
 The Ballad of Aimee McPherson.
 Aimee Semple McPherson on The California Museum's California Legacy Trails
 Photo essay on Aimee Semple McPherson's Lake Elsinore Castle retreat
 The theatricality of revivalism as exemplified in the artistry of Billy Sunday and Aimee Semple McPherson.
 Did McPherson send a "Minions of Satan" message to Herbert Hoover, and another article by the same historian later concluding she did not send such a message.
 
 Scandal and Censure: A Reinvestigation of the Socio-Political Forces Surrounding the Disappearance of Aimee Semple McPherson

 
1890 births
1944 deaths
20th-century evangelicals
1920s missing person cases
Activists from California
American anti-communists
American anti-fascists
American Christian creationists
American evangelicals
American evangelists
American faith healers
American Pentecostals
American temperance activists
Barbiturates-related deaths
Burials at Forest Lawn Memorial Park (Glendale)
Canadian emigrants to the United States
Canadian evangelicals
Canadian evangelists
Canadian Pentecostals
Christian fundamentalists
Drug-related deaths in California
Female religious leaders
Formerly missing people
History of Los Angeles
Kidnapped American people
Kidnapped Canadian people
Members of the Foursquare Church
Missing person cases in California
People from Oxford County, Ontario
Religious scandals
Vaudeville performers
Women evangelists